Sydney Kidd (born October 30, 1992) is a Canadian professional ice hockey player for the Toronto Furies of the Canadian Women's Hockey League (CWHL). Kidd was an inaugural member of the (formerly) New York Riveters of the NWHL in 2015.

Personal life
Kidd played collegiate-level women's ice hockey for the University of Western Ontario for five years between 2010 and 2015.

Kidd completed a master's degree in International Business at the prestigious Ivey Business School, winning a national title with the Western University Mustangs in 2015.

Playing career

NWHL
Kidd joined the New York Riveters as for the NWHL's inaugural 2015/16 season, with a reported $15,000 salary. Due to delays caused by work visa issues, Kidd played her first game with the team on November 15, 2015.

In November 2016, it was reported that Kidd may have joined the Riveters for the 2016/17 season as a practice player.

CWHL
In 2017, Kidd was drafted in the 3rd round by the Toronto Furies of the Canadian Women's Hockey League. Kidd currently plays as a forward for the CWHL team across North America and China.

References

External links
 

1992 births
Canadian women's ice hockey defencemen
Living people
New York Riveters players
Toronto Furies players
Western Mustangs women's ice hockey players